The striped mogurnda (Mogurnda vitta) is a species of fish in the family Eleotridae endemic to Lake Kutubu in Papua New Guinea.

References

Freshwater fish of Papua New Guinea
Mogurnda
Taxonomy articles created by Polbot
Fish described in 1986